Guangdong Ocean University (GDOU) was established in 1997 to provide courses in oceanography and maritime sciences. It is situated in the Zhanjiang City, Guangdong Province, China.

History
Guangdong Ocean University was originally set up as Zhanjiang Ocean University on January 10, 1997. It was merger of the 62-year-old Zhanjiang Fishery College and the 39-year-old Zhanjiang Agricultural Academy. In 1998, the university was granted permission to offer master's degrees and enroll foreign students. In 1999, the university passed the Undergraduate Teaching Qualification Assessment conducted by the Education Ministry of China. In 2003, it passed the Nautical Education and Training Quality System Examination and Authentication certified from the National Maritime Bureau.

In 2001, Zhanjiang Meteorological School with 48 years of history was merged into the Zhanjiang Ocean University giving it a comprehensive depth in Oceanic and Meteorological expertise.

In 2005, Zhanjiang Ocean University was renamed Guangdong Ocean University to better raise its profile as a leading university in oceanic and meteorological sciences.

Location
The university main campus is in Zhanjiang, Guangdong. It has a total area of 345 hectares, consisting of four campuses with different functions.

The other three campuses are Xiashan Campus, Haibin Campus and Cunjin Campus.

Administration
The university consist of 18 faculties, with 56 undergraduate programs and 15 graduate programs, and a current enrollment of 22,600 local and foreign students.

Faculties and Divisions
Faculty of Fishery
Faculty of Agriculture
Faculty of Engineering
Faculty of Foodstuff Technology
Faculty of Economic Management
Faculty of Navigation
Faculty of Information Technology
Faculty of Software
Faculty of Sciences
Faculty of Chinese Literature
Faculty of Law
Faculty of Art (with China Chorus)
Faculty of Foreign Studies
Faculty of Politics and Executive Studies
Faculty of Physical Education and Leisure
Division of Continuing Studies
Division of Vocational Education
Cunjin College

See also
List of universities and colleges in Guangdong
List of universities in China

References

External links
Guangdong Ocean University Official Website 

Universities and colleges in Zhanjiang
Maritime colleges in China
Educational institutions established in 1997
1997 establishments in China